Roswitha Krause (born 3 November 1949) is a retired German freestyle swimmer and team handball player. She is the first woman to win Summer Olympic medals in two different sports. Krause won a silver medal at the 1968 Summer Olympics in Mexico in the 4×100 m freestyle relay.

Biography
She then focused on handball and won a silver and a bronze medal with East German teams at the 1976 and 1980 Olympics, respectively, as well as two world titles in 1975 and 1978 and three European Cups. Meanwhile, she continued winning national titles in swimming through late 1970s.

She took up swimming because her doctor advised it to improve her shoulder condition; however, she noted in 1970 that her heart was always for ball sports, handball or football. In 1970 she started training in handball and for about a year did both swimming and handball every week. After that she focused on handball and by 1973 was part of the national team. She retired after the 1980 Olympics to coach handball and swimming at the Humboldt University.

See also
 Dual sport and multi-sport Olympians

References

External links
 

1949 births
Living people
People from Dahme, Brandenburg
East German female swimmers
German female handball players
Sportspeople from Brandenburg
Olympic silver medalists for East Germany
Olympic bronze medalists for East Germany
Swimmers at the 1968 Summer Olympics
Handball players at the 1976 Summer Olympics
Handball players at the 1980 Summer Olympics
Olympic bronze medalists in swimming
Olympic medalists in handball
East German female freestyle swimmers
Medalists at the 1980 Summer Olympics
Medalists at the 1976 Summer Olympics
Medalists at the 1968 Summer Olympics
Olympic silver medalists in swimming
Recipients of the Patriotic Order of Merit in bronze